The 2009 Sherbrooke municipal election was held on November 11, 2009, to elect a mayor and city councillors in Sherbrooke, Quebec. The communities of Brompton and Lennoxville also elected borough councillors, who do not serve on the city council.

Results

Mayor

Councillors

Brompton

Fleurimont

Lennoxville

Mark McLaughlin is a former vice-president of finance and administration of Bishop's University. He supported a tuition fee increase in April 2007, and in July of the same year he submitted a report that the institution was facing "an exceptional financial crisis." He moved to Lennoxville in 2002 and has served on the board of the Townshippers' Association. In the 2009 election, he promised that he would work to preserve his community's anglophone character and maintain its bilingual status. He wrote a public letter in 2010, opposing suggestions that the Brompton and Lennoxville borough councils should be eliminated; rather, he argues, they should be a model for other boroughs throughout the city.
Alan L. Ansell moved to Lennoxville in 1972. He worked for thirty-two years at Bishop's University, where he was coordinator of athletic facilities and chair of the environment and land-use committee; at the time of the 2009 election, he was retired. He highlighted sustainability and transport issues and said that he would work to defend Lennoxville's linguistic character.
Norman Green is a customer service agent. He called for greater diligence in the delivery of municipal services, noting that his family did not receive timely warnings about a water boiling advisory. He also highlighted safety issues and said that he would revive the community's moribund Neighbourhood Watch program.
Mohamed Adjel is a technician. He arrived in Sherbrooke in 1987 and moved to Lennoxville from the Sherbrooke East borough in 1996. In the 2009 campaign, he promised to uphold the community's anglophone character.
Bernard Rodrigue is an entrepreneur born in Lennoxville. He ran for the second borough seat in 2001 and 2009, losing both on both occasions. Fifty years old in 2001, he said that he would extend his community's infrastructure and protect its community's bilingual status.

Mont-Bellevue

Rock Forest–Saint-Élie–Deauville

Julien Lachance was born on March 7, 1959, in Sherbrooke. He has a Bachelor's degree in finance and an Executive Master of Business Administration degree, and has worked as an insurance broker and financial advisor. He was first elected to the Sherbrooke city council in 2001, defeating incumbent councillor Marie-Paule Samson. In February 2002, he was appointed to Mayor Jean Perrault's executive committee. He opposed efforts to de-amalgamate Sherbrooke in 2004. Re-elected over Pierre Harvey in 2005, Lachance was the only incumbent re-appointed to Perrault's executive committee after the campaign. He supported a new mall in his community in 2009. After being elected to a third term in 2009, Lachance was chosen as borough president for Rock-Forest-St-Elie-Deauville.

Jacques-Cartier

Source: Résultants 2009, Élections municipales 2009, Le Directeur général des élections du Québec.

References

2009 Quebec municipal elections
2009